Karbala Sport Club is an Iraqi football club based in Karbala that plays in the Iraqi Premier League, the top tier of Iraqi football.

SWAT Incident
On June 23, 2013, after a match against Al-Quwa Al-Jawiya, seven football players of Karbala FC and their coach were beaten by the anti-terror police. They used sticks and batons against the coach and his players. Five of them were in critical condition, and on the 30th of June, Mohammed Al-Jaboury, coach of Karbala FC has died in hospital.

Stadium

Karbala International Stadium  is a purpose built football stadium being constructed in Karbala, Iraq. It was opened in 2016 in which it has the capacity to hold 30,000 people and become the new home of the club.

Current squad

First-team squad

Honours
Iraq Division One
Winners: 2002–03 (shared)

References

External links

Karbala
1958 establishments in Iraq
Association football clubs established in 1958
Football clubs in Karbala